The Superior Court of Quebec is a superior trial court in the Province of Quebec, in Canada. It consists of 157 judges who are appointed by the federal government. Appeals from this court are taken to the Quebec Court of Appeal.

Jurisdiction 
The Superior Court of Quebec is the court of original general jurisdiction, which hears all cases not expressly assigned to another court or administrative body. It possesses both criminal and civil jurisdiction. It also hears certain appeals in criminal and penal matters. Moreover, it also possesses exclusive jurisdiction to hear and determine class actions and applications for injunctive relief. 

Furthermore, the Superior Court is vested exclusive jurisdiction of judicial review over all lower courts in Quebec, over legal persons established in the public interest or for a private interest, and over partnerships and associations and other groups not endowed with juridical personality.

All criminal matters that are tried by jury must be tried by the Superior Court.

Judges 
The Superior Court is composed of 157 justices, including a Chief Justice, a Senior Associate Chief Justice, and an Associate Chief Justice. It can also have a maximum of 111 supernumerary judges.

Chief Justices
Chief Justices (term): [partial listing]
 Edward Bowen (1849–1866)
 Sir William Collis Meredith (1866–1884)
 Sir Andrew Stuart (1885–1889)
 Sir Francis Godschall Johnson (1889–1894)
 Sir Louis-Napoléon Casault (1894–1904)
 Sir Adolphe-Basile Routhier (1904–1906)
 Sir Melbourne McTaggart Tait
 Sir Charles Peers Davidson (1912–1915)
 Sir François-Xavier Lemieux (1915–?)
 R.A.E. Greenshields (1929–1942)
 Albert Sévigny (1942–1959)
 Frédéric Dorion (1963–1973)
 Jules Deschênes (1973–1983)
 Alan B. Gold (1983–1992)
 Lawrence A. Poitras (1992–1996)
 Lyse Lemieux (1996–2004)
 François Rolland (2004–2015)
 Jacques R. Fournier (2015-2022)
 Marie-Anne Paquette (since 2022)

Sources and notes

 Superior Court of Quebec
 List of Superior Court Justices

Quebec courts
Quebec
1849 establishments in Canada
Courts and tribunals established in 1849